Croninia is a genus of flowering plants belonging to the family Ericaceae.

Its native range is Western Australia.

Species:
 Croninia kingiana (F.Muell.) J.M.Powell

References

Epacridoideae
Ericaceae genera